The DC Comics Classics Library was a line of hardcover comic book collections, collecting older DC Comics storylines in a standardized reprint format along a similar direction as Marvel Comics' Marvel Premiere Classic hardcover comic book collection line, which started in 2006. Nine volumes were released between 2009 and 2010 (a 10th volume was announced, but never published due to its cancellation), after which the line was cancelled. No further volumes were published after that (and none have been published to this day).

Collections

Reprints
In 2011, trade paperbacks were released for both the Roots of the Swamp Thing volume (with the same cover design as the hardcover version) and the Batman: A Death in the Family volume (with a new cover design that was different from the hardcover version) with both of them no longer bearing the DC Comics Classics Library name.

See also
 Marvel Premiere Classic
 List of comic books on CD/DVD

References

DC Comics lines